Gately is a surname. Notable people with the surname include:

George Gately (1928–2001), American cartoonist
Ian Gately (born 1966), Australian rugby league footballer
James Gately (1810-1875), also known as the Hermit of Hyde Park, a 19th-century English-born American hermit
Kevin Gately (1954–1974), English student killed during a protest
Leo Gately (born 1937), Australian politician
Stephen Gately (1976–2009), Irish pop singer

Places
Gately Building, a historic commercial building in downtown Pawtucket, Rhode Island

See also
Gateley (surname)